was a Japanese bureaucrat and the first President of the Asian Development Bank (ADB). He was in office from 24 November 1966 to 24 November 1972.

Watanabe was considered to be the "father" of ADB, as it was under his leadership that many of ADB's policies and targets were established, the first bond was issued in the Federal Republic of Germany in 1969, and in September 1972, donors agreed to set up ADB's multilateral source of concessional lending, the Asian Development Fund. He served as President of ADB from its inception in 1966 to 1972.

After resigning from ADB, Watanabe took on a number of roles including advisor to the Bank of Tokyo, President of the Japan Credit Rating Agency (JCRA), and honorary chairman of Japan Silver Volunteers Inc. He was also the first Japanese chairman of the Trilateral Commission. His book of memoirs of ADB "Towards a New Asia" was published in 1973.

Watanabe Takeshi died in Tokyo on Monday 23 August 2010, at the age of 104.

References

1906 births
2010 deaths
Japanese centenarians
Men centenarians